William Richardson Timmons IV (born April 30, 1984) is an American attorney, entrepreneur and politician serving as the U.S. representative for  since 2019. His district is in the heart of the Upstate and includes Greenville, Spartanburg, and most of their suburbs. A member of the Republican Party, Timmons served as the South Carolina state senator from the 6th district from 2016 to 2018.

Early life and education 
A native of Greenville, Timmons attended George Washington University's Elliott School of International Affairs, where he earned a degree in international affairs and political science. He earned a Juris Doctor and a master's degree in international studies from the University of South Carolina.

Timmons is a lifelong member of Christ Church in Greenville, and serves as a Captain in the South Carolina Air National Guard.

Timmons graduated from New York University in May 2021 with a Master of Science in cybersecurity.

Early career 
Timmons spent four years working for the 13th Circuit solicitor's office. In this role, he focused on serving victims of domestic violence and helped create a central court for all domestic violence cases in Greenville County.

Timmons owns Swamp Rabbit CrossFit and Soul Yoga, and previously operated the law firm Timmons & Company, LLC.

In 2016, Timmons challenged longtime state senator Mike Fair in the Republican primary for a Greenville-area district. He finished first in the primary with 49.5% of the vote, fewer than 100 votes shy of winning the nomination outright. He then defeated Fair in the runoff with 65% of the vote and faced no major-party opposition in the general election.

U.S. House of Representatives

Elections

2018 

Timmons was elected to replace retiring Republican incumbent Trey Gowdy in South Carolina's 4th congressional district. His campaign slogan was "Washington is broken." On June 10, Timmons placed second in a 13-candidate primary–the real contest in this heavily Republican district–receiving 19.2% of the vote. On June 28, 2018, Timmons defeated former state senator Lee Bright in the runoff with 54.2% of the vote. He did not have to give up his state senate seat to run for Congress; South Carolina state senators serve four-year terms that run concurrently with presidential elections.

Timmons defeated Brandon Brown in the November general election with 59.5% of the vote. He became one of the youngest U.S. representatives from South Carolina since 1972.

2020 

Timmons defeated Democratic nominee Kim Nelson with 61.6% of the vote.

2022 

In a four-candidate Republican primary, Timmons prevailed with 52.7% of the vote; he was the only candidate on the general election ballot as his Democratic opponent dropped out in August.

Tenure
Timmons was sworn into office on January 3, 2019, amid a government shutdown. He cosponsored legislation to require Congress to balance the budget, defund Planned Parenthood, support Gold Star Families, strengthen national defense, and promote school choice.

Timmons serves on the Financial Services Committee, where he introduced legislation seeking to counter China's efforts to expand its 5G influence in countries receiving assistance from international financial institutions. He was elected by his classmates to represent the freshman class on the Republican Steering Committee.

He introduced legislation proposing an amendment to the Constitution of the United States to limit the number of consecutive terms that a member of Congress may serve (H.J.Res.86).

Timmons supported President Donald Trump during his first impeachment, saying of the process, "It is very, very, very broken" (referring to his 2018 campaign slogan "Washington is broken"). He added that he thought the process would be fair in the Senate and called the opposition to impeachment "bipartisan."

In December 2020, Timmons was one of 126 Republican members of the House of Representatives to sign an amicus brief in support of Texas v. Pennsylvania, a lawsuit filed at the United States Supreme Court contesting the results of the 2020 presidential election, in which Joe Biden defeated Trump. The Supreme Court declined to hear the case on the basis that Texas lacked standing under Article III of the Constitution to challenge the results of an election held by another state.

In January 2021, Timmons announced he would object to the certification of Biden as president.  When Congress reconvened after the storming of the United States Capitol, Timmons voted to object to the Electoral College results.

Committee assignments 
Committee on Financial Services 
 Subcommittee on Financial Institutions and Monetary Policy
 Subcommittee on Digital Assets, Financial Technology and Inclusion
 Committee on Oversight and Accountability
 Subcommittee on Cybersecurity, Information Technology and Government Innovation
 Subcommittee on Government Operations and the Federal Workforce

Caucus memberships 

 Republican Study Committee

Electoral history

Personal life
On July 17, 2019, Timmons married his wife, Sarah, on the balcony of the U.S. Capitol. Senator Tim Scott officiated.

In response to posts on social media, Timmons acknowledged in July 2022 that he and his wife were working on their marriage after "going through tough times" in recent months. He said other allegations were false and mostly defamatory and asked for "privacy and prayers." He told his constituents "don't be distracted" and emphasized that his personal life does not affect his congressional service.

Sarah filed for marital separation in mid-November 2022. In a statement provided to The Greenville News, the couple said they "will continue to remain close friends" and "respectfully ask for privacy". Divorce proceedings can begin a year after separation per South Carolina law.

References

External links 
 Congressman William Timmons official U.S. House website
 William Timmons for Congress
 
 
 

|-

|-

1984 births
Living people
21st-century American lawyers
21st-century American politicians
Elliott School of International Affairs alumni
Politicians from Greenville, South Carolina
Republican Party members of the United States House of Representatives from South Carolina
South Carolina lawyers
South Carolina National Guard personnel
Republican Party South Carolina state senators
South Carolina state solicitors
University of South Carolina alumni
United States Army officers